The Soviet Union (USSR) competed at the 1960 Summer Olympics in Rome, Italy. 283 competitors, 233 men and 50 women, took part in 145 events in 17 sports.

Medalists
The USSR finished first in the final medal rankings, with 43 gold and 103 total medals.

Gold
 Larisa Latynina — Artistic gymnastics, women's floor exercise
 Boris Shakhlin — Artistic gymnastics, men's individual all-round
 Larisa Latynina — Artistic gymnastics, women's individual all-round
 Boris Shakhlin — Artistic gymnastics, men's parallel bars
 Boris Shakhlin — Artistic gymnastics, men's pommel horse
 Albert Azaryan — Artistic gymnastics, men's rings
 Sofia Muratova, Larisa Latynina, Polina Astakhova, Tamara Lyukhina-Zamotailova, Lidiya Kalinina-Ivanova, Margarita Nikolaeva — Artistic gymnastics, women's team competition
 Polina Astakhova — Artistic gymnastics, women's uneven bars
 Boris Shakhlin — Artistic gymnastics, men's vault
 Margarita Nikolaeva — Artistic gymnastics, women's vault
 Pyotr Bolotnikov — Athletics, men's 10000 m
 Vladimir Golubnichy — Athletics, men's 20 km walk
 Lyudmila Lisenko-Shevtsova — Athletics, women's 800 m
 Irina Press — Athletics, women's 80 m hurdles
 Nina Romashkova — Athletics, women's discus throw
 Vasili Rudenkov — Athletics, men's hammer throw
 Robert Shavlakadze — Athletics, men's high jump
 Viktor Tsybulenko — Athletics, men's javelin throw
 Elvīra Ozoliņa — Athletics, women's javelin throw
 Vera Krepkina — Athletics, women's long jump
 Tamara Press — Athletics, women's shot put
 Oleg Grigoryev — Boxing, men's bantamweight
 Leonid Geishtor, Sergei Makarenko — Canoeing, men's C-2 1000 m
 Antonina Seredina — Canoeing, women's K-1 500 m
 Mariya Shubina, Antonina Seredina — Canoeing, women's K-2 500 m
 Viktor Kapitonov — Cycling road, men's individual road race
 Sergei Filatov and his horse Absent — Equestrian, individual mixed
 Viktor Zhdanovich — Fencing, men's foil individual
 Viktor Zhdanovich, Mark Midler, Yuri Rudov, Yuri Sisikin, German Sveshnikov — Fencing, men's foil team
 Valentina Prudskova, Aleksandra Zabelina, Lyudmila Shishova, Tatyana Petrenko-Samusenko, Galina Gorokhova, Valentina Rastvorova — Fencing, women's foil team
 Valentin Boreiko, Oleg Golovanov — Rowing, men's coxless pair
 Vyacheslav Ivanov — Rowing, men's single sculls
 Timir Pinegin, Fyodor Shutkov — Sailing, Star class
 Aleksey Gushchin — Shooting, men's 50 m pistol
 Viktor Shamburkin — Shooting, men's rifle 3 positions
 Yury Vlasov — Weightlifting, men's heavyweight
 Yevgeni Minaev — Weightlifting, men's featherweight
 Viktor Georgiyevitch Bushuyev — Weightlifting, men's lightweight
 Aleksandr Kurynov — Weightlifting, men's middleweight
 Arkady Vorobyov — Weightlifting, men's middle-heavyweight
 Ivan Bogdan — Wrestling, men's Greco-Roman superheavyweight
 Oleg Karavaev — Wrestling, men's Greco-Roman bantamweight
 Avtandil Koridze — Wrestling, men's Greco-Roman lightweight

Silver
 Larisa Latynina — Artistic gymnastics, women's balance beam
 Yuri Titov — Artistic gymnastics, men's floor exercise
 Polina Astakhova — Artistic gymnastics, women's floor exercise
 Sofia Muratova — Artistic gymnastics, women's individual all-round
 Boris Shakhlin — Artistic gymnastics, men's rings
 Boris Shakhlin, Yuri Titov, Albert Azaryan, Vladimir Portnoi, Valeri Kerdemilidi, Nikolai Miligulo — Artistic gymnastics, men's team competition
 Larisa Latynina — Artistic gymnastics, women's uneven bars
 Sofia Muratova — Artistic gymnastics, women's vault
 Nikolay Sokolov — Athletics, men's 3000 m steeplechase
 Gusman Kosanov, Leonid Bartenev, Yuriy Konovalov, Edvin Ozolin — Athletics, men's 4 × 100 m relay
 Tamara Press — Athletics, women's discus throw
 Valery Brumel — Athletics, men's high jump
 Vladimir Goryaev — Athletics, men's triple jump
 Yuri Korneev, Yanis Krumins, Guram Minashvili, Valdis Muizhniek, Tsezar Ozer, Aleksandr Petrov, Mikhail Semyonov, Vladimir Ugrekhelidze, Maigonis Valdmanis, Albert Valtin, Gennadi Volnov, Viktor Zubkov — Basketball, men's team competition
 Sergei Sivko — Boxing, men's flyweight
 Yuri Radonyak — Boxing, men's welterweight
 Aleksandr Silaev — Canoeing, men's C-1 1000 m
 Yuri Sisikin — Fencing, men's foil individual
 Valentina Rastvorova — Fencing, women's foil individual
 Nikolai Tatarinov, Hanno Selg, Igor Novikov — Modern pentathlon, men's team competition
 Aleksandr Berkutov, Yuriy Tyukalov — Rowing, men's double sculls
 Antanas Bogdanavichus, Zigmas Yukna, Igor Rudakov — Rowing, men's pair-oared shell with coxswain
 Aleksandr Chuchelov — Sailing, men's Finn class
 Makhmud Umarov — Shooting, men's 50 m pistol
 Marat Niyazov — Shooting, men's 50 m rifle 3 positions
 Vladimir Semyonov, Anatoly Kartashov, Vladimir Novikov, Petre Mshvenieradze, Yuri Grigorovsky, Viktor Ageev, Givi Chikvanaya, Leri Gogoladze, Vyacheslav Kurennoi, Boris Goikhmann and Yevgeni Saltsyn — Water polo, men's team competition
 Trofim Lomakin — Weightlifting, men's middle-heavyweight
 Vladimir Sinyavsky — Wrestling, men's freestyle lightweight
 Georgi Skhirtladze — Wrestling, men's freestyle middleweight

Bronze
 Sofia Muratova — Artistic gymnastics, women's balance beam
 Tamara Lyukhina-Zamotailova — Artistic gymnastics, women's floor exercise
 Boris Shakhlin — Artistic gymnastics, men's horizontal bar
 Yuri Titov — Artistic gymnastics, men's individual all-round
 Polina Astakhova — Artistic gymnastics, women's individual all-round
 Tamara Lyukhina-Zamotailova — Artistic gymnastics, women's uneven bars
 Vladimir Portnoi — Artistic gymnastics, men's vault
 Larisa Latynina — Artistic gymnastics, women's vault
 Semen Rzhischin — Athletics, men's 3000 m steeplechase
 Vasili Kuznetsov — Athletics, men's decathlon
 Birutė Kalėdienė — Athletics, women's javelin throw
 Igor Ter-Ovanesyan — Athletics, men's long jump
 Vitold Kreer — Athletics, men's triple jump
 Boris Lagutin — Boxing, men's light-middleweight
 Yevgeni Feofanov — Boxing, men's 71–75 kg
 Viktor Kapitonov, Yevgeni Klevtsov, Yuri Melikhov, Aleksei Petrov — Cycling road, men's team time trial
 Rostislav Vargashkin — Cycling track, men's 1 km time trial
 Boris Vasilyev, Vladimir Leonov — Cycling track, men's 2000 m tandem
 Stanislav Moskvin, Viktor Romanov, Leonid Kolumbet, Arnold Belgardt — Cycling track, men's team pursuit
 Ninel Krutova — Diving, women's 10 m platform
 Bruno Khabarov — Fencing, men's épée individual
 Valentin Chernikov, Guram Kostava, Arnold Chernushevich, Bruno Khabarov, Aleksandr Pavlovsky — Fencing, men's épée team
 Igor Akhremchik, Yuriy Bachurov, Valentin Morkovkin, Anatoli Tarabrin — Rowing, men's four without coxswain
 Aleksandr Zabelin — Shooting, men's 25 m rapid fire pistol
 Vasily Borisov — Shooting, men's 300 m free rifle 3 positions
 Sergei Kalinin — Shooting, men's trap
 Savkus Dzarasov — Wrestling, men's freestyle heavyweight
 Vladimir Rubashvili — Wrestling, men's freestyle featherweight
 Anatoli Albul — Wrestling, men's freestyle light-heavyweight
 Konstantin Vyrupaev — Wrestling, men's Greco-Roman featherweight
 Givi Kartoziya — Wrestling, men's Greco-Roman light-heavyweight

Athletics

Basketball

Boxing

Men's flyweight (– 51 kg)
 Sergey Sivko →  Silver Medal
 First Round — Bye
 Second Round — Defeated Chung Shin-Cho (KOR), KO-1
 Third Round — Defeated Antoine Porcel (FRA), DSQ-3
 Quarterfinals — Defeated Manfred Homberg (FRG), 5:0
 Semifinals — Defeated Kiyoshi Tanabe (JPN), 4:1
 Final — Lost to Gyula Török (HUN), 2:3

Canoeing

Cycling

13 male cyclists represented the Soviet Union in 1960.

 Individual road race
 Viktor Kapitonov
 Yury Melikhov
 Yevgeny Klevtsov
 Gaynan Saydkhuzhin

 Team time trial
 Viktor Kapitonov
 Yevgeny Klevtsov
 Yury Melikhov
 Aleksei Petrov

 Sprint
 Boris Vasilyev
 Imants Bodnieks

 1000 m time trial
 Rostislav Vargashkin

 Tandem
 Boris Vasilyev
 Vladimir Leonov

 Team pursuit
 Stanislav Moskvin
 Viktor Romanov
 Leonid Kolumbet
 Arnold Belgardt

Diving

Equestrian

Fencing

21 fencers, 15 men and 6 women, represented the Soviet Union in 1960.

 Men's foil
 Viktor Zhdanovich
 Yury Sisikin
 Mark Midler

 Men's team foil
 Viktor Zhdanovich, Yury Sisikin, Mark Midler, German Sveshnikov, Yury Rudov

 Men's épée
 Bruno Habārovs
 Guram Kostava
 Arnold Chernushevich

 Men's team épée
 Guram Kostava, Bruno Habārovs, Arnold Chernushevich, Valentin Chernikov, Aleksandr Pavlovsky

 Men's sabre
 David Tyshler
 Yakov Rylsky
 Nugzar Asatiani

 Men's team sabre
 Yevgeny Cherepovsky, Umyar Mavlikhanov, Nugzar Asatiani, David Tyshler, Yakov Rylsky

 Women's foil
 Valentina Rastvorova
 Galina Gorokhova
 Aleksandra Zabelina

 Women's team foil
 Valentina Rastvorova, Galina Gorokhova, Tatyana Petrenko-Samusenko, Lyudmila Shishova, Valentina Prudskova, Aleksandra Zabelina

Gymnastics

Modern pentathlon

Three male pentathletes represented the Soviet Union in 1960. In the team event, they won the silver medal.

 Individual
 Igor Novikov
 Nikolay Tatarinov
 Hanno Selg

 Team
 Igor Novikov
 Nikolay Tatarinov
 Hanno Selg

Rowing

The Soviet Union had 25 male rowers participate in seven rowing events in 1960.

 Men's single sculls – 1st place ( Gold medal)
 Vyacheslav Ivanov (Вячеслав Иванов)

 Men's double sculls – 2nd place ( Silver medal)
 Aleksandr Berkutov (Александр Беркутов)
 Yuriy Tyukalov (Юрий Тюкалов)

 Men's coxless pair – 1st place ( Gold medal)
 Valentin Boreyko (Валентин Борейко)
 Oleg Golovanov (Олег Голованов)

 Men's coxed pair – 2nd place ( Silver medal)
 Antanas Bagdonavičius (Antanas Bagdonavichyus, Антанас Багдонавичюс)
 Zigmas Jukna (Zigmas Yukna, Зигмас Юкна)
 Igor Rudakov (Игорь Рудаков)

 Men's coxless four – 3rd place ( Bronze medal)
 Igor Akhremchik (Игорь Ахремчик)
 Yury Bachurov (Юрий Бачуров)
 Valentin Morkovkin (Валентин Морковкин)
 Anatoly Tarabrin (Анатолий Тарабрин)

 Men's coxed four – 4th place
 Oleg Aleksandrov (Олег Александров)
 Igor Khokhlov (Игорь Хохлов)
 Boris Fyodorov (Борис Фёдоров)
 Valentin Zanin (Валентин Занин)
 Igor Rudakov (Игорь Рудаков)

 Men's eight
 Mikhail Balenkov (Михаил Баленков)
 Viktor Barinov (Виктор Баринов)
 Viktor Bogachev (Виктор Богачев)
 Voldemar Dundur (Вольдемар Дундур)
 Nikolay Gomolko (Николай Гомолко)
 Boris Gorokhov (Борис Горохов)
 Leonid Ivanov (Леонид Иванов)
 Vladimir Malik (Владимир Малик)
 Yury Lorentsson (Юрий Лоренцсон)

Sailing

Shooting

Ten shooters represented the Soviet Union in 1960. Between them, they won three bronze medals, two silvers and two golds.

25 m pistol
 Aleksandr Zabelin
 Yevgeny Cherkasov

50 m pistol
 Aleksey Gushchin
 Makhmud Umarov

300 m rifle, three positions
 Vasily Borisov
 Moisei Itkis

50 m rifle, three positions
 Viktor Shamburkin
 Marat Nyýazow

50 m rifle, prone
 Vasily Borisov
 Marat Nyýazow

Trap
 Sergey Kalinin
 Yury Nikandrov

Swimming

Water polo

Weightlifting

Wrestling

Medals by republic
In the following table for team events number of team representatives, who received medals are counted, not "one medal for all the team", as usual. Because there were people from different republics in one team.

References

External links
 Official Olympic Reports
 International Olympic Committee results database
  – for medal stats by republic

Nations at the 1960 Summer Olympics
1960
Summer Olympics